Marie Lora-Mungai is a French media entrepreneur, producer, writer and TV showrunner. She is the founder and CEO of Restless Global, a company focused on the development and production of African-inspired stories for an international audience. She also founded or co-founded the talent agency Restless Talent Management, leading African VOD service Buni.tv, and production company Buni Media, all under the name Restless Global.

Education
Lora-Mungai graduated from Sciences Po Paris in 2003 with a masters in Political Sciences, and from ESCP Business School in 2004 with a masters in Marketing and Communication.

Life and career
Lora-Mungai started her career in 2004 at CNN's New York bureau, where she occupied various producing positions, including on the shows Paula Zahn Now and Diplomatic License with Richard Roth. During that time, she covered the 2004 US presidential campaign and published 'Marketing Politique: Mode d'Emploi', an analysis of the political marketing techniques used by George W. Bush and John Kerry.

In 2006 she moved to Nairobi, Kenya, to establish herself as a foreign correspondent, working for CNN, Reuters TV, AFP TV, and the BBC World Service in 15 countries across Africa. In 2008, she received a UN Correspondent Association Gold Medal for Best Broadcast for her series of reports on the Darfur crisis. In 2009 she was nominated for Best Television Feature and Journalist of the Year at the DIAGEO Business Reporting Awards.

In 2009 she co-founded Buni Media, a multimedia production company, with political cartoonist Gado (Godfrey Mwampembwa) from Tanzania. Together they launched The XYZ Show, a political satire show with puppets, inspired by Les Guignols de L'Info and Spitting Image. The XYZ Show rapidly became very popular, airing on national television stations Citizen TV, Kiss TV, and later NTV. In 2013 The XYZ Show won the Africa Magic Viewers' Choice Award for Best TV Series.

In 2012 Lora-Mungai launched Buni.tv, one of the pioneers and leading platforms of the VOD space in Africa. In June 2016, Buni.tv was acquired by urban entertainment group Trace TV.

In 2013 she was named a Rising Talent by the Women's Global Forum, and one of the "30 Women who matter" by L'Express magazine. She has been listed on the Choiseul Institute's list of "200 Economic Leaders of Tomorrow" since 2015.

In 2014 Lora-Mungai and Gado launched a similar show to The XYZ Show in Nigeria called Ogas At The Top, which also went viral and was listed by CNN as "one of the 8 African shows to watch". In 2015 it was nominated for Best Online Video at the Africa Magic Viewers Choice Awards.

Two years later, she and business partner Tendeka Matatu announced the launch of talent agency Restless Talent Management at the Cannes film festival. In February 2015, Lora-Mungai launched Restless Global to focus on the development and production of complex and ambitious African stories for an international audience. Restless Global's production slate includes State of Betrayal, a political thriller film based on Michela Wrong's book It's Our Turn to Eat, and The Trade, a crime drama series set in the world of the West African drug trade which is being developed in partnership with Canal+ Overseas.

Lora-Mungai was listed by Forbes France as one of the "10 women entrepreneurs to follow in 2016". In March 2017, she was named a Young Global Leader by the World Economic Forum.

In 2021, she and co-author Pedro Pimienta wrote a comprehensive study published by UNESCO, called The African film industry. Trends, challenges and opportunities for growth. This study, available online, offers a mapping of the film and audiovisual industry in 54 States of the African continent, including quantitative and qualitative data and an analysis of their strengths and weaknesses at the continental and regional levels.

References

External links
 

French television producers
Women television producers
Mass media company founders
Living people
French people of Spanish descent
Year of birth missing (living people)
Place of birth missing (living people)